is a member of the Japanese Communist Party that was elected in to the House of Representatives, representing the Hokkaido proportional representation block. He is against the Trans-Pacific Partnership and thinks that Japan should demand the return of the Kuril Islands from Russia.

References

Living people
Japanese communists
Japanese Communist Party politicians
Year of birth missing (living people)